Corazón Salvaje (English: Wild Heart) is a Mexican telenovela produced by Salvador Mejía Alejandre for Televisa in 2009. It is based on the novel Corazón salvaje from 1957.

Aracely Arámbula (playing a double role) and Eduardo Yáñez star as the protagonists, while Cristián de la Fuente, Helena Rojo, Elizabeth Gutiérrez and Enrique Rocha star as the antagonists. With stellar performances of Laura Flores, Osvaldo Ríos, René Casados, Silvia Manriquez and Laisha Wilkins.

Plot
In the year 1851 near the port city of Veracruz, María del Rosario (Laura Flores) falls in love with Juan de Dios San Román (Osvaldo Ríos), a humble fisherman, unaware that another man, Rodrigo Montes de Oca (Enrique Rocha), is in love with her. María del Rosario confesses her love for Juan de Dios to her sister, Leonarda (Helena Rojo), and tells her of their plans to wed, unbeknownst that Leonarda harbors a deep hatred for her sister because she is secretly in love with Rodrigo. Leonarda tells Rodrigo about her sister's wedding plans, and he uses his influence with the authorities to stop the wedding and incarcerate Juan de Dios for life. While visiting him in prison, María del Rosario confesses to Juan de Dios that she is expecting their child. Rodrigo and Leonarda decide to confine María del Rosario to an estate by the sea. Juan de Dios escapes from jail and searches for María del Rosario, but Rodrigo discovers their plans to escape and tries to shoot him. Juan de Dios flees the estate as María del Rosario has begged; he swears he will return for her and their child. María del Rosario gives birth to her son. Leonarda has a servant leave the newborn boy in the jungle to die, while lying to her sister that the baby died. Upon hearing the news, María del Rosario spirals into insanity. Leonarda decides to deceive Rodrigo and pass her sister off as dead while locking María del Rosario away in the estate’s basement dungeon. All the while, María del Rosario's son has been rescued from the jungle by Remigio. He adopts the boy as his brother and takes the child to be raised by Aurora who baptizes him as Juan de Dios, as requested by a note left with the baby.

Leonarda expects to win Rodrigo after her sister's supposed death. When Rodrigo responds by leaving Mexico, she decides to marry Noel Vidal (René Casados), Rodrigo's friend, who she does not love. After a few years, they have a son, Renato (Cristián de la Fuente).

Rodrigo announces his return, and Leonarda believes that he is returning for her, but to her great surprise, he arrives married to Constanza (Laisha Wilkins), who is expecting a child. Out of jealousy and anger, Leonarda poisons Constanza. She dies shortly after giving birth to twins Regina and Aimée (both portrayed by Aracely Arámbula).

Time passes, in 1880, the now adult Juan decides to return to Mexico to fulfill a deathbed oath he made to his father to seek revenge against Rodrigo Montes de Oca. Only now, Juan has taken the surnames of his adoptive parents. On the ship to Mexico, Juan meets Aimée, who is impressed with him and a torrid relationship full of eroticism and sensuality is born between the two, even though Juan portrays himself to Aimée as a humble poor man. Regina, Aimée's twin sister, disapproves of their relationship. Meanwhile, Regina wants to marry Renato because she has been in love with him since childhood, but he is in love with Aimée, so Regina enters a convent and becomes a nun. Juan discovers eventually that Aimée is the daughter of his worst enemy and angrily rejects her. He considers Aimée and Regina innocent of their father’s treachery against his father and thus leaves Veracruz. Aimée, rejected by Juan, marries Renato as she cannot live without the luxuries he offers.

Thus begins a story of adultery, lies, deceptions, paralleled against the love born between two unsuspecting people who will face trials and tribulations in order to fight for their love for one another.

Cast

Main

Also main

Supporting

Awards and nominations

Broadcast
Corazón Salvaje premiered on Monday, October 12, 2009, replacing Sortilegio. The final episode was broadcast on Friday, April 16, 2010, and it was replaced with Soy tu dueña. In the United States, it premiered on Monday, February 22, 2010 on Univision at 9 PM, again replacing Sortilegio. Beginning Monday, April 26, 2010, Corazón Salvaje was moved from prime time to the midnight time slot due to its low ratings.

Rating
Corazón Salvaje debuted in Mexico with a rating of 25.8 and a share of 42.1%.

Corazón Salvaje debuted in United States with a rating of 4.1 million viewers.

References

External links
Official website

 

2009 telenovelas
2010 telenovelas
2009 Mexican television series debuts
2010 Mexican television series endings
Mexican telenovelas
Spanish-language telenovelas
Televisa telenovelas
Television shows set in Veracruz